Tarlac's 3rd congressional district is one of the three congressional districts of the Philippines in the province of Tarlac. It has been represented in the House of Representatives since 1987. The district consists of the southern Tarlac municipalities of Bamban, Capas, Concepcion and La Paz. It is currently represented in the 18th Congress by Noel N. Rivera of the Nationalist People's Coalition (NPC).

Representation history

Election results

2022

2019

2016

2013

2010

See also
Legislative districts of Tarlac

References

Congressional districts of the Philippines
Politics of Tarlac
1987 establishments in the Philippines
Congressional districts of Central Luzon
Constituencies established in 1987